Ahmed bin Abdulaziz Al Saud ( Aḥmed bin ʿAbdulʿazīz Āl Suʿūd; born 5 September 1942) is a member of House of Saud who served as deputy minister of interior from 1975 to 2012 and briefly as minister of interior in 2012. He was detained in March 2020 on the orders of his brother and nephew, King Salman and Crown Prince Mohammed bin Salman, respectively, and charged with treason.

Early life and education
Prince Ahmed was born in Riyadh on 5 September 1942. He is the son of King Abdulaziz and Hassa bint Ahmed Al Sudairi and the youngest of the Sudairi brothers. Prince Ahmed is supposedly the 31st son of King Abdulaziz.

Ahmed bin Abdulaziz completed secondary education in 1961. He studied English and some science subjects at the University of Southern California (USC). He joined University of Redlands in 1962 and graduated in 1968 with a bachelor's degree in government and political science.

Career
After his graduation, Prince Ahmed dealt with business and was the chairman of the National Gypsum Company from 1969 to 1970. In 1971, he was appointed the undersecretary of Makkah Province. He also served as the deputy governor of Makkah Province during the reign of King Faisal. Later, King Khalid appointed him as the deputy minister of interior on 16 December 1975, and he remained in office until 18 June 2012 when he was named interior minister. 

His main function as deputy interior minister was to deal with the different provinces of the Kingdom. Ahmed bin Abdulaziz was also operational head of special security force, which reports directly to the interior minister. This force was established in 1979 after the poor performance of the SANG at the Grand Mosque Seizure in Makkah. 
 
Prince Ahmed was given the task of introducing reforms in the Eastern Province during the early 1980s to improve the province where the kingdom's Shi’ite minority lives. In fact, this task was given him in the wake of the riots experienced in the province in 1979 to make observations about the effects of the Iranian Revolution and the Shi’ite dissention on the security of oil industry. Prince Ahmad openly declared that the Saudi government had neglected the region and had actively discriminated against its Shi’ite population. He also promised massive investments in the development of Al Hasa's economic infrastructure, educational system, and other services. The other task of Prince Ahmed as deputy interior minister was to coordinate the contacts with ulema (the religious leaders). He also served as the vice president of the supreme commission for industrial security and chairman of preparatory committee for national security. In addition, he was the deputy chairman of civil defense council. Saudi journalist Jamal Khashoggi stated that Prince Ahmed was mostly involved in administrative matters instead of security during his tenure as deputy interior minister.

Prince Ahmed was appointed interior minister on 18 June 2012 after the death of Interior Minister Prince Nayef. Abdul Rahman Al Rabiaan succeeded him as deputy interior minister. It was reported that Prince Ahmed would not change the major security policies of Saudi Arabia since the country experienced a threat from Al Qaeda in Yemen and an unrest among its Shi'ite Muslim minority. His appointment as interior minister was also regarded at the time as a move signalling that he was the most likely candidate to rule Saudi Arabia after King Abdullah and Crown Prince Salman. Prince Ahmed was the chairman of the supreme hajj committee during his term as interior minister. However, Prince Ahmed's tenure only lasted until 5 November 2012, and he was succeeded by Mohammed bin Nayef, who had been deputy interior minister. The official reason for Prince Ahmed's removal was given as his request. However, his objection to dividing the security forces into independent units was one of the actual reasons for his dismissal.

Exclusion from the succession
Nawaf E. Obaid argued in 2002 that three members of the House of Saud were especially popular, although many of them were believed to be corrupt. Prince Ahmed was one of these popular members; the others were Crown Prince Abdullah and Riyadh governor Prince Salman. Prince Ahmed was also seen as one of the potential candidates to the Saudi throne at the beginning of the 2000s. 

However, on 5 November 2012 he was sidelined in the sense that he was left without any major job, and on 1 February 2013 Prince Muqrin was appointed second deputy prime minister and on 27 March 2014 to the new position of deputy crown prince. As of 2015 Prince Ahmed was still the favourite crown prince of the reformists who argued that Prince Ahmed held a more legitimate claim to the throne by birthright.

Arrest
On 7 March 2020 Prince Ahmed was arrested along with his son Nayef and his nephews, Mohammed bin Nayef and Nawwaf bin Nayef. The Saudi government claimed that the princes were plotting to overthrow King Salman and his son, Crown Prince Mohammed bin Salman.

Views and activities
Together with Nayef bin Abdulaziz Al Saud, Prince Ahmed was reported to pay massive bonuses to successful security officers, but they also had a reputation for honesty and using the massive security budget only for the mission and not to enrich themselves.

Ahmed bin Abdulaziz visited Pakistan in November 2005 for three days and examined the extent of destruction caused by the Kashmir earthquake from an airplane. He promised to provide Pakistan whatever needed for the rebuilding process after the earthquake. He encouraged all Muslim nations to provide aid to Pakistan. He also condemned terrorism and stated it was incompatible with Islam. Prince Ahmed called for a "border fence" between Saudi Arabia and Iraq. The plan for the fence was initiated in 2006 and he stated repeatedly it would not become a "segregation wall".

On 29 November 2010, he attended the Crown Prince Cup, an annual horse race on behalf of Crown Prince Sultan who was in Morocco. He said in a press conference in 2011 that for women, driving is against the law. After his appointment as interior minister, it was argued that, like Salman, he was also a supporter of King Abdullah's cautious reform initiatives.

Ahmed bin Abdulaziz is one of three members of the Allegiance Council who did not support the appointment of Mohammad bin Salman as crown prince on 21 June 2017. The others were Muhammad bin Saad Al Saud and Abdulaziz bin Abdullah bin Abdulaziz Al Saud. The latter represented his older brother, Khalid bin Abdullah, at the meeting of the council.

In 2018 Ahmed bin Abdulaziz left Saudi Arabia for London. On 4 September 2018, he was confronted by protesters shouting slogans against him and the House of Saud outside his residence in London. He responded to the protesters by asking them to blame the current ruling Saudi Monarch and the current Crown Prince Mohammad bin Salman instead. Following the repercussions from the killing of Jamal Khashoggi, news reports suggested that he had returned to Saudi Arabia in October 2018 (after he got guarantees from the US and UK Governments regarding his personal security) to help the Royal Family control the situation and possibly help usurp some of the Crown Prince's powers.

Personal life
Ahmed bin Abdulaziz has two wives with whom he has five daughters and seven sons. One of his wives is Fahda bint Turki Al Sudairi. His eldest son, Abdulaziz, is former secretary general of Arab Ophthalmology and was born in Redlands, California, when Prince Ahmed was attending the University of Redlands. Another son, Nayef, holds a PhD from Cambridge University and was a colonel in the Saudi Armed Forces with responsibilities for strategic planning. He served as the head of land forces intelligence and security authority until his arrest on 7 March 2020. Another son, Prince Sultan, was appointed the ambassador to Bahrain in September 2019, and he is known to have a keen interest in politics and international affairs. 

One of Prince Ahmed's daughters, Falwa bint Ahmed, is married to Salman bin Sultan, former assistant general secretary of the National Security Council. Another, Noura, was the former wife of Faisal bin Abdullah Al Saud. Noura bint Ahmed who was born in Redlands, California, in November 1968 is the third child of Prince Ahmed. Her mother is Fahda bint Turki Al Sudairi, and she is the full sister of Abdulaziz bin Ahmed. 

On 26 July 1999 Prince Ahmed was awarded an honorary doctorate of humanities from his alma mater, the University of Redlands. He was honorary president of Saudi Alzheimer's Charitable Society.

Ancestry

References

External links
 House of Saud Profile

Ahmed
Ahmed
Ahmed
Ahmed
1942 births
Ahmed
Living people
Saudi Arabian prisoners and detainees
Ahmed
Ahmed